Euderces guerinii is a species of beetle in the family Cerambycidae. It was described by Louis Alexandre Auguste Chevrolat in 1862 and is known from Colombia.

References

Euderces
Beetles of South America
Arthropods of Colombia
Beetles described in 1862
Taxa named by Louis Alexandre Auguste Chevrolat